USS Luckenbach may refer to various United States Navy ships:

 , a cargo ship and troop transport in commission from 1918 to 1919
 USS Edward Luckenbach (ID-1662), a cargo ship and troop transport in commission from 1918 to 1919
 , a cargo ship and troop transport in commission from 1918 to 1919
 , a collier in commission from 1918 to 1919
 , a cargo ship and troop transport in commission from 1918 to 1919
 , a cargo ship and troop transport in commission from 1918 to 1919
 , a cargo ship and troop transport in commission from 1918 to 1919
 USS Luckenbach Tug No. 1 (ID-1232), a tug commissioned in 1917 and renamed  18 days later
 , a cargo ship and troop transport in commission from 1918 to 1919

See also
 , a commercial cargo ship from 1901 to 1922, formerly the German Saale of 1886
 Luckenbach No. 4, a tug commissioned in 1917 as 
 SS Mary Luckenbach, a commercial cargo ship in service from 1947 to 1959 that previously served in the U.S. Navy as 
 Edgar F. Luckenbach (1868–1943), businessman and owner of the Luckenbach Steamship Company, Inc.



United States Navy ship names